Tullio Bozza (3 February 1891 – 13 February 1922) was an Italian fencer. He won a gold medal in the team épée event at the 1920 Summer Olympics.

References

External links
 

1891 births
1922 deaths
Italian male fencers
Olympic fencers of Italy
Fencers at the 1920 Summer Olympics
Olympic gold medalists for Italy
Olympic medalists in fencing
Fencers from Naples
Medalists at the 1920 Summer Olympics